José Juan Bautista Pampuro (28 December 1949 – 21 January 2021) was an Argentine politician. He was a member of the Justicialist Party, a Defense Minister and a senator for Buenos Aires Province. From 2006 to 2011 he served as the Provisional President of the Senate.

Political career
Pampuro entered public service in 1983, when he was named Public Health Secretary to the Mayor of Lanús, Manuel Quindimil. He was elected to the Lower House of Congress on the populist Justicialist Party ticket in 1987, and was named Minister of Health and Social Policy for Buenos Aires Province by newly elected Governor Eduardo Duhalde in 1991.

He was named director of the Buenos Aires Provincial Office (each Argentine province maintains one in the nation's capital) in 1993, and remained in the post until being returned by voters to Congress in 1999. Eduardo Duhalde, appointed President of Argentina by Congress during a crisis in 2002, named Pampuro General Secretary of the Presidency, and on 25 May 2003, he was retained in government by President Néstor Kirchner, who named Pampuro his first Defense Minister.

Pampuro was elected to the Senate on the Front for Victory slate alongside Cristina Fernández de Kirchner in the 2005 mid-term elections, in which the center-left Front for Victory did well. He was elected Provisional President of the Senate on 22 February 2006, putting him second in line to the presidency, and twice as President of the Mercosur Parliament (during the first half of 2008 and the first half of 2010).

Pampuro retired from the Senate in 2011 with the distinction of being the first man in Argentina to twice be succeeded by women who were first to hold their respective posts: as Defense Minister by Nilda Garré, and as Provisional President of the Senate by Beatriz Rojkés de Alperovich.

Personal life
Pampuro was born in Buenos Aires in 1949. He enrolled at the University of Buenos Aires and earned a Medical Degree.

Pampuro died of cancer on 21 January 2021 at a hospital in Buenos Aires, aged 71.

References

|-

|-

1949 births
2021 deaths
People from Buenos Aires
Argentine people of Italian descent
University of Buenos Aires alumni
Argentine physicians
Members of the Argentine Chamber of Deputies elected in Buenos Aires Province
Defense ministers of Argentina
Members of the Argentine Senate for Buenos Aires Province
Justicialist Party politicians
Deaths from cancer in Argentina